These were the 10 squads picked to take part in the 2006 ICC Champions Trophy, the fourth instalment of the Champions Trophy cricket tournament. The tournament was held in India from 7 October to 5 November 2006. Teams could name a preliminary squad of 30, but only 14-man squads were permitted for the actual tournament, and these had to be submitted by 7 September, one month before the start of the tournament.

Several of the squads were changed during or before the tournament due to injuries or suspensions; Pakistan changed their captains three times before the tournament had begun, and also sent home two players due to doping allegations. Both India and Zimbabwe had to replace a player during the tournament, which required the permission of the International Cricket Council's Technical Committee.

Australia

Australia picked a preliminary squad of 30 players, before cutting it down to 14 on 4 September. Stuart Clark suffered a thigh injury and missed the tournament. Dan Cullen was called up as a replacement on 5 October.

Bangladesh

Bangladesh selected their squad of 14 on 7 September.

England

England announced a squad of 14 on 12 September, after picking their preliminary squad of 30. Andrew Flintoff, who had not played cricket since July, was named captain.

India

India selected their squad at the same time as announcing their squad for the 2006–07 DLF Cup. Spinner Anil Kumble, with 264 ODIs under his belt, was not selected, which was made headline news by cricket website Cricinfo.

New Zealand

New Zealand selected a preliminary squad of 30, before cutting it down to 14 on 7 September. Scott Styris was included despite missing a county match with Middlesex due to injury; Shane Bond, Jacob Oram and Daniel Vettori had all recovered from injuries and were included, while Michael Mason was ruled out by an injury. The selection of Wellington seamer Mark Gillespie, described by coach John Bracewell as "the domestic season's outstanding pace bowler", was described by Herald on Sunday writer Dylan Cleaver as a "bolter".

Pakistan

Pakistan selected their squad on 6 September. Captain Inzamam-ul-Haq have been suspended for four matches due to "bringing the game into disrepute" during the fourth Test of the 2006 series between England and Pakistan, and was thus withdrawn from the squad, and was unable to take any part in the tournament, as Faisal Iqbal was called up as replacement. Younis Khan was named replacement captain, only to resign two days before the tournament began, leading Shahid Afridi to take over. However, on 7 October, the new Pakistan Cricket Board chairman Naseem Ashraf announced that Younis would captain the side.

On 16 October, before Pakistan had started playing any games in the tournament, it was revealed that two Pakistani players, Mohammad Asif and Shoaib Akhtar had failed a drugs test for the banned anabolic steroid nandrolone. Abdur Rehman and Yasir Arafat were called up to replace them.

South Africa

South Africa selected their squad of 14 on 7 September. The omission of spinner Nicky Boje, with 115 ODI caps for South Africa, was described as "interesting" by Cricinfo.

Sri Lanka

Sri Lanka picked a 14-man squad on 25 August 2006.

West Indies

West Indies went in with the same 14-man squad as in the 2006–07 DLF Cup triangular tournament in Malaysia in September.

Zimbabwe

Gary Brent replaced Terry Duffin before the match with Bangladesh on 13 October.

References and notes

ICC Champions Trophy squads
2006 ICC Champions Trophy